KIYS (101.7 FM) is a radio station broadcasting a Top 40 (CHR) format serving the Jonesboro, Arkansas, area. The station is currently owned by East Arkansas Broadcasters.

KIYS broadcast in the HD Radio format.

History
This format was previously located at 101.9 KIYS in the Jonesboro, Arkansas market. On September 10, 2010, the 101.9 KIYS frequency relocated to Crawfordsville, Arkansas where it began to target the Memphis area as "101.9 Radio Now". While located in Jonesboro, the station was CHR as "Kiss FM", owned by Clear Channel, but operated by East Arkansas Broadcasters under a local marketing agreement (LMA).  After the 101.9 signal was moved to Crawfordsville, East Arkansas Broadcasting acquired KRLW, which had been at 106.3, and moved the frequency over to 101.7 and relaunched it as "101.7 Kiss FM." KIYS is the only radio station in Arkansas to be an affiliate with Dan Ingram's Top 40 Satellite Survey in the 1980s.

KIYS-HD2
KIYS-HD2 airs an adult hits format under the Bob FM brand. The channel is simulcast on analog FM via translator K231BV College City, Until November 18, 2019, it carried an active rock format branded as The Buzz, before temporarily stunting with Christmas music until its current format premiered December 26.

References

External links
Official Website

Radio stations established in 1999
1999 establishments in Arkansas
IYS
Contemporary hit radio stations in the United States